Hayward High School may refer to:

 Hayward High School (California)
 Hayward High School (Wisconsin)

See also
 Sir Jack Hayward High School, in Freeport, Bahamas; see Jack Hayward
 Hayward (disambiguation)